Milk It may refer to:

 "Milk It" (song), a song by Nirvana
 Milk It (album), an album by Death in Vegas